Kuzbassugol Building Complex is a building complex located in the Tsentralny City District of Novosibirsk, Russia. It was built in 1931–1933. Architects: B. A. Gordeyev, D. A. Ageyev, B. A. Bitkin.

Location
The building complex is located in the city block between Sovetskaya, Frunze, Derzhavin streets and Krasny Avenue opposite Oblplan House. It consists of 6 residential buildings and one school.

Gallery

See also
 Polyclinic No. 1
 Sotsgorod of Sibkombain
 Aeroflot House

References

Tsentralny City District, Novosibirsk
Buildings and structures in Novosibirsk
Buildings and structures completed in the 1930s
Constructivist architecture
Cultural heritage monuments of regional significance in Novosibirsk Oblast